Rocco Placentino (born 25 February 1982) is a Canadian retired international soccer player. He is currently the technical director of Canadian club CS Saint-Laurent.

Career

Club
Born in Montreal, Quebec, Placentino spent most of his early career in the Italian lower leagues, representing Avellino, Teramo, Cavese, Gualdo, Massese and Gubbio.

On 22 May 2008, Placentino returned to his hometown team, the Montreal Impact, having originally left the team for Italy six seasons previously. During the 2009 USL season, Placentino scored a goal in the playoff quarterfinal match against the Charleston Battery. On 26 November 2009, Placentino signed a two-season contract with the Impact. Afterwards, he joined A.C. Perugia Calcio in the Serie C2

International
Placentino represented Canada at youth level, and earned one cap for the senior team on 3 September 2005, in a 2–1 friendly loss over Spain.

References

External links
 

1982 births
U.S. Avellino 1912 players
A.S. Gubbio 1910 players
Association football midfielders
Canada men's international soccer players
Canada men's under-23 international soccer players
Canada men's youth international soccer players
Canadian expatriate soccer players

Canadian expatriate sportspeople in Italy

Canadian people of Italian descent
Canadian soccer players
Expatriate footballers in Italy
Living people
Montreal Impact (1992–2011) players
Soccer players from Montreal
U.S. Massese 1919 players
USL First Division players
USSF Division 2 Professional League players
Serie B players
Première ligue de soccer du Québec players
FC St-Léonard players
ACP Montréal-Nord players